Bringhurst may refer to the following:

 Bringhurst - a village located in Leicestershire, England
 Bringhurst House - a historic building currently used as a welcome center for the Germantown White House
 Bringhurst, Indiana - a town in Indiana
 Bringhurst (surname)